Black's may refer to:

Black's Law Dictionary
Black's Medical Dictionary
Black's Beach, La Jolla, San Diego, California
Black's Store, Hampton, Illinois

Formerly Black's
Blacks Photo Corporation, formerly "Black's"
Zamora, California, formerly Black's

See also
Blacks (disambiguation)
Black (disambiguation)

 (2022)